Sumit Sambhal Lega (English: Sumit Will Handle All) is an Indian Hindi-language sitcom television series which premiered on 31 August 2015 on STAR Plus. The series is the Hindi adaptation of Warner Bros sitcom series Everybody Loves Raymond. Sony Entertainment Television acquired the rights of syndication of series in May 2020.

Plot
The show revolves around the life of Sumit who lives with his family at D-124, Greater Kailash in Delhi. Whiny and flippant, Sumit does not take many things seriously, making jokes in nearly every situation, no matter how troubling or problematic they are. He often avoids responsibilities around the house and with his kids, leaving them to his wife. Many times Sumit gets caught for his mischievous activities. In the end, his brother Rajneesh marries his girlfriend despite much trouble and begins to live on the third floor of Sumit's home.

Cast

Main cast

 Namit Das as Sumit Walia
 Manasi Parekh as Maya Seth Walia
 Saniya Touqeer as Aliya Walia
 Avisha Sharma as Avi Walia
 Bharati Achrekar as Dolly Walia
 Satish Kaushik as Jasbir Walia
 Vikram Kochhar as Rajneesh Walia
 Benaf Dadachandji as Simran Walia......

Recurring cast

 Mohan Kapoor as Jay Seth
 Kavita Kapoor as Avantika Seth
 Muni Jha as Nirmal Anand
 Seema Pandey as Pavitra Anand
 Rakesh Bedi as Satbir Ahluwalia
 Kiran Juneja as Pammi Ahluwalia
 Anita Kanwal as Minti Mausi: Dolly's sister
Amardeep Jha as Santoshi
 Vindhya Tiwari as Reema
 Sonia Rakkar as Miss Mishri
 Anand Tiwari as Namit
 Navina Bole as Natasha
 Soni Singh as Nagina
 Himani Shivpuri as Rita
 Chirag Vohra as Nirdharit
 Jatin Sapru as Sports Presenter (cricket room)
Lekh Tandon as Happy Tau

Special appearances

 Kapil Dev as Interviewee (Episode 17)
 Harsha Bhogle as Host of "Cricket Room" (Episode 23)

Production
The series is an adaptation of Everybody Loves Raymond with a similar essence from the original version along with some deviations and a mix of Indian culture and nuances. For instance, Sumit (Raymond's Indian character) and his family along with his parents live in the same house itself as seen in Indian tradition while in the original version Raymond's parents live across the street from Raymond.

Steve Skrovan, who was a writer on the original series, was part of the team transforming the remake for India and also assisted the team in writing. Arshad Sayed, Chirag Mahabal and Sumit Roy wrote the Hindi scripts.

Speaking about the series Namit Das expressed, "Finally, a show from a man’s point of view — just a fun-loving and light-hearted show. In an industry where women-centric kitchen politics rule, here is a show, that for once would address the married man’s perspective."

The makers wanted to bring the next season of the series but did not get support from the channel as the series did not perform well in terms of TRP.

Reception
Firstpost reviewed, "In Sumit Sambhal Lega, the dialogues are neither particularly funny nor sparkling. Everybody Loves Raymond or Full House or FRIENDS are great examples of how American television writing grabs your attention from the very first scene with its writing. Unfortunately, the emphasis in India appears to be on the packaging instead of the writing. Neither is Everybody Loves Raymond, but you get drawn to the show because of the hilarious repartee and dialogues, the banter between characters, and the very believable reactions. Nothing was over-the-top or seemed illogical."

Daily News and Analysis stated, "The makers have failed to bring the humor, the punch lines and the spunk of the original show. This is a light-hearted and breezy comedy laced with a subtle message that does touch a chord at times. The humour in Everybody Loves Raymond comes from the witty dialogue and the one-liners, which is missing in Sumit." Criticizing the characters, they said, "From the casting to the writing, the series is a complete letdown. Namit Das as Sumit comes across more as a whiny wimp than Ray Romano's Raymond, who was more spunky and entertaining. Mansi Parekh, who steps into Patricia Heaton's shoes is adequate, but not as funny as the latter was. The otherwise talented Bharti Achrekar who plays Dolly Walia is over-the-top (her boy cut and loud make-up add to it). Satish Kaushik as Jasbir Walia delivers a good performance as the obese and always hungry father while Vikram Kocchar as Sumit's elder brother is annoying and thankfully doesn't have much to do."

India Today stated, "Namit would have been doing the job well enough had the makers NOT touted Sumit Sambhal Lega as Everybody Loves Raymond's Indian adaptation. With a heavy heart, though, the sloppy, extremely-difficult-to-love character Kaushik is now playing in Sumit Sambhal Lega does not do justice to the man's stature and experience of 33 years. And his on-screen wife, Bharati Achrekar is not helping the cause either. Thanks to the short boy-cut hair and ostentatious portrayal of her can't-let-go-of affection for Sumit, the battle between her and Manasi Parekh Gohil is organically won by the latter--Maya Walia being the closest to her touted original, Debra Barone."

Hindustan Times said, "It is definitely different than what is being shown on other channels and brings a breath of freshness with light, harmless comedy." Stating about the characters, they reviewed, "Namit Das as Sumit looks like any 'husband-next-door' but needs to brush up his comic timing. Manasi Parekh is Maya, the wife, and plays her part well. Bharati Achrekar plays the mom who doesn't know the word 'Privacy'. The funniest one however is Satish Kaushik who plays the forever-hungry father." However they also expressed to improve the plot and funnier dialogues.

News 18 quoted the series as a refreshing change stating, "Subtle humor on Indian television has been missing for a long time and sitcoms revolving around urban milieu had become a rarity. 'Sumit Sambhal Lega' has emerged as a refreshing change as it is a throwback to light-hearted family comedies."

Awards and nominations

See also
 List of Hindi comedy shows

References

External links
 

Hindi comedy shows
2015 Indian television series debuts
Indian television series based on American television series
Indian television sitcoms
Hindi-language television shows
Television shows set in Delhi
StarPlus original programming
2016 Indian television series endings